Parkharan (also Romanized as Farkharān and Parrokhran; also known as Parkhazān, Kārkharān, and Pārkhārān) is a village in Sina Rural District, in the Central District of Varzaqan County, East Azerbaijan Province, Iran. At the 2006 census, its population was 341, in 66 families.

References 

Towns and villages in Varzaqan County